Major contributions to the science of microbiology (as a discipline in its modern sense) have spanned the time from the mid-17th century month by month to the present day. The following is a list of notable microbiologists who have made significant contributions to the study of microorganisms. Many of those listed have received a Nobel prize for their contributions to the field of microbiology. The others are typically considered historical figures whose work in microbiology had a notable impact in the field. Those microbiologists who currently work in the field have been excluded unless they have received recognition beyond that of being on the faculty in a college or university.

Proto-microbiologists (pre-1670s) 
 Marcus Terentius Varro
 Avicenna
 Girolamo Fracastoro
 Marcello Malpighi
 Athanasius Kircher
 Jan Swammerdam
 Robert Hooke

Microbiologists

Living 
 Ilan Chet (born 1939), Israeli microbiologist, professor, and President of the Weizmann Institute of Science
 Pauline Johnson, immunologist
 Rita R. Colwell, American environmental microbiologist who studied the ecology of cholera, former director of the National Science Foundation and president of the American Society for Microbiology
 Wayne Nicholson, American biologist based on microbiology and cell biology

References 

 
Lists of biologists by field
Medical lists